Willard "Bill" Drawn Frederick (born July 6, 1934) is a former American politician who served as the 30th Mayor of Orlando, Florida from 1981 to 1992, succeeding after Mayor Carl Langford. 

Frederick was a member of the Democratic Party until 1999, when he switched to the Republican Party.

Personal life

Early life 
Frederick was born on July 6th, 1934. He graduated from Duke University with a bachelor's degree in history and a law degree from the University of Florida Levin College of Law. Served as a paralegal in the United States Navy, and was a member the Navy Pistol Team. He arrived to Orlando, Florida in 1961.

Recognition

Awards 
Mayor Frederick was awarded Orlando's Key of the City. In 2010, he received the Orlando Business Journal's award for Most Influential Businessman Legacy Award.

See also
1980 Orlando mayoral election
1984 Orlando mayoral election
1988 Orlando mayoral election

References

External links 

Living people
1934 births
Duke University alumni
Florida Democrats
Florida Republicans
Fredric G. Levin College of Law alumni
Mayors of Orlando, Florida
People from Winter Haven, Florida